Guitars were a major component of the "rock and roll" image created by Elvis Presley in the 1950s and 1960s, onstage and in film appearances.

According to his first lead guitarist, Scotty Moore, Presley was not "an accomplished musician", yet he possessed "an uncanny and amazing sense of timing and rhythm." In the early years of his career, Presley's rhythm guitar accompaniment played a major role in the sound of his early performances and recordings. Moore noted that as Presley began to learn to move on stage and to work the audience with his physical performance, his guitar became more of a "prop".

Presley was not known to treat his instruments gently. The lack of a microphone on his guitar in his early years contributed to the development of his "aggressive style in attempt to be heard," and his strumming style would frequently break strings during his performances. As his career progressed, he became even more aggressive toward his instruments, frequently tossing his guitar to Charlie Hodge, who sometimes failed to catch it. As well, the large belt buckles and jewelry Presley wore left their marks on most of his instruments.

Performance guitars
The following is a list of guitars that Presley owned or used for his performances and recordings.

Film guitars
The following is a list of "prop" guitars that Presley used on screen during musical numbers in his 31 theatrical films. These guitars were purchased by the studios, and in some cases, were identical to Presley's own performance guitars. The Gibson J-200 used in Loving You, King Creole, and G.I. Blues, for example, was identical to the Gibson J-200 he purchased in October 1956 (serial number A-22937).

Gallery

References

Notes

Citations

External links

Electric guitars
Guitars
Individual guitars
Instruments of musicians